Jay Dee Adcox (December 24, 1950 – July 26, 2011) was an American football player and coach. A former player at the University of Missouri in the late 1960s, he served as the head football coach at Peru State College in Peru, Nebraska from 1983 to 1985, compiling a record of 13–16.

References

External links
 

1950 births
2011 deaths
Missouri Tigers football players
Missouri Western Griffons football coaches
Morehead State Eagles football coaches
Peru State Bobcats football coaches
Southern Arkansas Muleriders athletic directors
Southern Arkansas Muleriders football coaches
People from Snoqualmie, Washington